The Pulitzer Prize for Photography was one of the American Pulitzer Prizes annually awarded for journalism. It was inaugurated in 1942 and replaced by two photojournalism prizes in 1968: the Pulitzer Prize for Feature Photography and "Pulitzer Prize for Spot News Photography", which was later renamed Pulitzer Prize for Breaking News Photography in 2000.

The Pulitzer Prizes were established by the bequest of Joseph Pulitzer, which suggested four journalism awards, and were inaugurated beginning 1917. By 1942 there were eight Pulitzers for journalism; for several years now there have been 14 including the two for photojournalism.

Winners
There were 26 simple Photography prizes awarded in 26 years including two in 1944 (for 1943 work) and none in 1946.

References

Photojournalism awards
Photography

Awards established in 1942
1942 establishments in the United States
Pulitzer Prize